Alice Brown Chittenden (October 14, 1859 – October 13, 1944) was an American painter based in San Francisco, California who specialized in flowers, portraits, and landscapes. Her life's work was a collection of botanicals depicting California wildflowers, for which she is renowned and received gold and silver medals at expositions. She taught at the Mark Hopkins Institute of Art (now the San Francisco Art Institute) from 1897 to 1941.

Personal life 
Chittenden was born in Brockport, New York on October 14, 1859 to Joseph Gladding Chittenden and Ann Miriam Green Chittenden. Her parents had settled in San Francisco in 1858 from New York, but her mother returned to New York to await her birth. She had a sister, Carrie, who was two years younger than herself.

Her father worked in wood mills in San Francisco. She attended Denman Grammar School and won a silver medal for being at the top of her class when she graduated in 1876. She studied with Virgil Williams at the School of Design (later known as the California School of Fine Arts and, today, San Francisco Art Institute) from 1880 to 1882. She received medals for both drawing and painting.

She married Charles Parshall Overton in 1886 but left him and returned to her parents home in 1887, a few months before her daughter Miriam Overton was born in 1887. Overton became vice president and manager of the Union Fish Company in San Francisco. Alice was divorced by 1900 when she and her daughter, Miriam, lived with her mother on Octavia Street in San Francisco. Her sister, Carrie, and her family also lived with Ann M. Chittenden. Carrie's husband was William Taylor, a sea captain. Chitterden never remarried.

New Woman 
As educational opportunities were made more available in the 19th century, women artists became part of professional enterprises, including founding their own art associations. Artwork made by women was considered to be inferior, and to help overcome that stereotype women became "increasingly vocal and confident" in promoting women's work, and thus became part of the emerging image of the educated, modern and freer "New Woman". Artists then, "played crucial roles in representing the New Woman, both by drawing images of the icon and exemplyfying this emerging type through their own lives." Chittenden exemplified the "New Woman" through her activism for social reform and the suffrage movement.

Career 
She painted throughout her life. Although she did travel to the East Coast of the United States, Italy and France to study and exhibit during her life, her career was rooted in San Francisco where she was considered the "Grand Dame" of Nineteenth Century San Francisco women artists, who was said to have "evinces a powerful genius" through the "magic of her brush."

She created many paintings of flowers, especially roses, chrysanthemums, and peonies. Her life's work was a series of more than 256 botanical paintings of 350 varieties of California wildflowers executed over a period of 50 years. Chittenden was named the leading flower painter of America in Kate Field's Washington newspaper in March 1895. She gathered many specimens herself locally in the San Francisco Bay Area but also during long trips via horseback and stagecoach to the Sierra Nevada Mountains or the deserts of Southern California. These studies were painted using oils on paper. She received assistance from her friend Alice Eastwood, who was the curator of botany at the California Academy of Sciences in San Francisco.

Her works were so precise that they added not only to art, but also to the field of science.

She also painted many portraits, often with pastels. She made portraits of James W. Marshall at Sutter's Mill (1914) in the collection of the State Museum Resource Center, California State Parks; Robert Gordon Sproul, President of the University of California; and Judge John H. Boalt who donated funds to build the first Boalt Hall which houses the University of California School of Law at UC Berkeley. She also painted many landscapes.

In the 1880s she had a studio in San Francisco on the fourth floor of the Phelan Building. Chittenden exhibited two paintings (one of chrysanthemums and another of roses) at the  California
State Building at the 1893 World's Columbian Exposition in Chicago, Illinois. In 1885 the San Francisco Art Association held an all-women's exhibition, thought to be the first major exhibition of that type in the United States, that included Chittenden's works. She exhibited at the all-male Bohemian Club Winter Picture Show in 1895, although not a member of the club she was uncommonly invited to attend the show.

She taught art beginning in 1897 at the Hopkins Art School (later the California School of Design) at California University and in 1902 lectured at the Brooklyn Institute on "Wild Flowers of California". In 1907 through at least 1918 Chittenden was an Assistant Professor of Drawing at the California School of Design.

Chittenden was the first woman to be a juror of the San Francisco Art Association exhibitions. In 1906, she helped organize the Women's Sketch Club. She exhibited at National Academy of Design in New York and in 1908 at the Salon of Société des Artistes Français in Paris.

In 1941 she retired from her teaching position at the California School of Fine Arts and was made a lifetime member of the San Francisco Art Association for her distinguished career.

Alice Brown Chittenden died on October 13, 1944 in San Francisco and funeral services were held in the city at the N. Gray and Company funeral home.

In 1965, 261 oil paintings of wildflowers were exhibited at the California Historical Society. The studies had been in storage at the California Academy of Sciences. A limited publication of 1,000 copies of four of her wildflower paintings was printed and issued in 1968 by Lawton and Alfred Kennedy. From the Elizabeth Hay Bechtel Collection at the University of California, Berkeley, the paintings included Chamomile, Mayweed; Thimbleberry; Fairy Lantern, Globe Lily; and Common Evening Primrose. An exhibit entitled "California Native Trees" was held in 1992 at the Helen Crocker Russell Library, San Francisco Botanical Garden, Golden Gate Park. The Society of California Pioneers has a portrait and two paintings of historic buildings.

Her papers were donated to the Smithsonian American Art Museum by Elizabeth Baldwin in 1974, which was transferred to microfilm and a copy of which is held at the de Young Museum, Archives of American Art in San Francisco.

Awards 
Some of the awards she received include:

 Gold medal for Flower Painting: San Francisco Exposition of Arts and Industries, 1891
 Two Silver Medals: California State Fair, 1891–92
 Silver Medal: San Francisco Industrial Exposition, 1893
 Silver Medal: California Mid Winter International Exposition, 1894
 Silver Medal: World Columbian Exposition, Chicago, 1902–03
 Silver Medal: Alaska-Yukon-Pacific Exposition of Seattle, 1909
 Silver Medal: Lewis and Clark Centennial Exposition of Portland, 1905

Notes

References

Further reading 
 Rebecca Deville. Alice Brown Chittenden: Reconsidering the Role of San Francisco Women Artists in the Late 19th and Early 20th Centuries. University of California, Davis; 2007.
 Alice Eastwood; Edward Hohfeld; May Treat Morrison. Alice Eastwood Collection. 1942.
 Who Was Who in American Art. Compiled from the original thirty-four volumes of American Art Annual: Who's Who in Art, Biographies of American Artists Active from 1898–1947. Edited by Peter Hastings Falk. Madison, CT: Sound View Press, 1985.

External links

 Alice Brown Chittenden web site

American women painters
Artists from San Francisco
Flower artists
San Francisco Art Institute alumni
1859 births
1944 deaths
19th-century American painters
20th-century American painters
19th-century American women artists
20th-century American women artists